The 2022 Big West Conference men's basketball tournament was the postseason men's basketball tournament for the Big West Conference of the 2021–22 NCAA Division I men's basketball season. It was held March 8–12, 2022, at the Dollar Loan Center in Henderson, Nevada. The winner, the Cal State Fullerton Titans, received the conference's automatic bid to the 2022 NCAA tournament.

Seeds
Of the 11 conference teams, 10 were eligible for the tournament. UC San Diego was ineligible for the tournament, as it was in the second year of the four-year transition required for teams transferring to Division I from Division II. Teams were seeded by record within the conference, with a tiebreaker system to seed teams with identical conference records. Unlike previous years, reseeding teams after the quarterfinals did not take place for the 2022 tournament.

Schedule and results

Bracket

References

Big West Conference men's basketball tournament
Tournament
Big West Conference men's basketball tournament
Big West Conference men's basketball tournament
Sports competitions in Henderson, Nevada
Basketball competitions in the Las Vegas Valley
College basketball tournaments in Nevada
College sports tournaments in Nevada